Salehi (also Romanized as Şāleḩī; also known as Gheshlagh Salehi and Qeshlāq-e Şāleḩī) is a village in Sang Sefid Rural District, Qareh Chay District, Khondab County, Markazi Province, Iran. At the 2006 census, its population was 220, in 45 families.

References 

Populated places in Khondab County